Max Régnier (4 December 1907 - 5 August 1993) was a French dramatist, play writer, theater director and actor. He was managing director of the théâtre de la Porte-Saint-Martin from 1949 up to 1969.

He was the father of actor Yves Rénier.

Filmography

Cinema 
as an actor unless stated otherwise
 1936 : Le Coup de trois by Jean de Limur : le secrétaire du commissaire
 1936 : , short by Robert Péguy : Monsieur Croquignolle
 1937 :  by André Hugon : Max / Monsieur Bégonia
 1938 :  by André Hugon – short
 1948 :  by Jean Tedesco (+ scriptwriting and dialogues)
 1950 : L'Art d'être courtier by Henri Verneuil – short (only co scriptwriter)

Television 
Actor
 1979 : , Les Petites Têtes by André Gillois and Max Régnier, directed by Pierre Sabbagh 
 1981 : Au théâtre ce soir, Mort ou vif by Max Régnier, directed by Pierre Sabbagh

Theater 
 1947 : Mort ou vif de Max Régnier, directed by Christian-Gérard, théâtre de l'Étoile (author and actor)
 1948 : Il vaux mieux en rire, directed by Émile Audiffred, Les Tournées Audiffred
 1955 : Les Petites Têtes by André Gillois and Max Régnier, directed by Fernand Ledoux,  : Daniel (co writer and actor)
 1957 : Champagne et Whisky by Max Régnier, directed by the author, théâtre de la Renaissance : Lestissac (author, theatre director and actor)
 1965 : Le Plus grand des hasards by Max Régnier and André Gillois, mise-en-scène Georges Douking, théâtre de la Porte-Saint-Martin : Hubert Cabanel (coauteur et acteur)

References

External links 

20th-century French dramatists and playwrights
20th-century French male actors
1907 births
1993 deaths
Place of birth missing
Place of death missing